The  Philadelphia Eagles season was the franchise's 59th season in the National Football League.

Despite having a 10–6 record and finishing with the top-ranked defense in the NFL, the Eagles failed to make the playoffs. During Week 1, quarterback Randall Cunningham was lost for the season with a knee injury.

Statistics site Football Outsiders ranks the 1991 Eagles as the greatest defensive team in their ranking's history. Says Football Outsiders: The 1991 Eagles completely lap the field in terms of defensive DVOA. Only the 2002 Bucs had a better pass defense, and only the 2000 Ravens had a better run defense, and the Eagles were much more balanced than either of those teams.

It's crazy to imagine how few points the Eagles might have given up if they were playing with a halfway-decent offense instead of losing Randall Cunningham to a torn ACL in the first game of the season. The Eagles were stuck depending on an over-the-hill Jim McMahon for 11 starts, plus Jeff Kemp for two and Brad Goebel for two. McMahon actually wasn't half bad ... but the other two quarterbacks were awful, especially Goebel who had no touchdowns with six interceptions. And the running game was dreadful, with 3.1 yards per carry as a team.

Still, the Eagles were fifth in the league in points allowed, and first in yards allowed by nearly 400 yards – and the team that was second in yards allowed is also on that top-ten defenses list, the 1991 New Orleans Saints. The Eagles allowed 3.9 yards per play, where no other team allowed fewer than 4.5. As bad as their running game was, their run defense was even better, allowing 3.0 yards per carry. Three-fourths of the starting defensive line was All-Pro (Reggie White, Jerome Brown, and Clyde Simmons). Linebacker Seth Joyner and cornerback Eric Allen made the Pro Bowl as well.

Overview

A "real" fresh start 
On January 8, team owner Norman Braman opted not to renew the contract of Buddy Ryan, the Eagles' head coach since 1986. On the same day, Braman promoted then-offensive coordinator Rich Kotite, making him the 18th head coach in club history. They opened with a 3–1 mark, their best start since 1981, despite having lost Cunningham for the year due to a knee injury suffered at Green Bay thanks to a hit from Bryce Paup on opening day. After coming on to lead the Eagles to their solid start, backup QB Jim McMahon was also injured in Game 5, a shutout loss to the Redskins.

A winless October 
With McMahon sidelined, the Birds offense would stall completely, including a stretch of 11 straight quarters without scoring a touchdown, culminating into a four-game skid. By mid-season, Philadelphia had used five different quarterbacks, including rookie Brad Goebel, former Jets backup Pat Ryan and former Niners third-stringer Jeff Kemp in eight games and saw its record sink to 3–5.

A relatively healthy McMahon returns 
Week 10 saw McMahon return to the lineup for a Monday night, 30–7 victory over the defending Super Bowl Champion New York Giants at Veterans Stadium. However, the following week at Municipal Stadium would be a little closer. The Eagles won 32–30 as Philadelphia spotted Cleveland a 23–0 lead early in the second quarter, before staging a comeback behind a battered McMahon (passing for 341 yards and three touchdowns). Before the game, McMahon's elbow was so swollen, his roommate Ron Heller had to tie his pony tail for him, and then told his lineman he wouldn't be able to play. But Birds trainer Otho Davis used a concoction he calls "Grandma's Goop" on the elbow and McMahon was able to go. These wins would resurrect the season, and the Birds would continue this surge into contention for a playoff berth with a six-game winning streak (the club's longest since the start of '81). This upped their record to 9–5.

The signature win of the run was a 13–6 Monday night victory against the Oilers in Houston on December 2, later dubbed the "House of Pain" game for the Eagles' defense punishing Warren Moon and his receiving corps en route to victory.

Heart of a champion 
"In '91, I broke five ribs off my sternum in New York and bruised my heart. I could've punctured it, but it just bruised." -Jim McMahon, 2014
The season ending rib injury to McMahon in Week 15 (a 19–14 win against the Giants) made way for a devastating loss at home to Dallas in Week 16, ending Philadelphia's playoff hopes. However, the season was highlighted by a 10–6 record, allowing the Eagles to join the 49ers as the only NFL clubs to post 10-or-more wins in each of the last four seasons. Both teams missed the postseason in '91 despite winning 10 games.

A defense that rewrote the record books 
Philadelphia's defense finished the season ranked first in the NFL in fewest passing yards, rushing yards, and total yards allowed. As such, the Eagles became only the fifth club in NFL history and the first since 1975 to accomplish this rare triple. Five members of that defensive unit represented the Eagles in the Pro Bowl – DEs Reggie White and Clyde Simmons, DT Jerome Brown, and LB Seth Joyner were selected as starters while CB Eric Allen also made the NFC squad. The selection of White, Simmons, and Brown marked only the sixth time in NFL history that three defensive linemen from one team were elected to the Pro Bowl.

In addition, the Eagles' defense led the NFL in sacks and fumble recoveries and tied for the league lead in takeaways. The Eagles' 48 defensive takeaways in 1991 is tied for the most in the NFL in the 1990s.

Offseason

NFL draft 

The 1991 NFL draft was held April 21–22, 1991 at the Marriott Marquis hotel in Manhattan, New York. The Eagles with a 10–6 record in 1990 had the 19th or 20th pick in each round. They also held the number eight pick of the first round, choosing Antone Davis, an offensive tackle out of the University of Tennessee. The team's first round pick at number 19 was traded away earlier and acquired by the Green Bay Packers. Over the course of the 12-round draft, Philadelphia made 12 selections.

Other notable events

Following the previous season, head coach Buddy Ryan was fired and replaced by their offensive coordinator Rich Kotite, a position Kotite would hold for the next four seasons.

Personnel

Staff

Roster

Regular season

Schedule 

Note: Intra-division opponents are in bold text.

Game summaries

Week 1: at Green Bay Packers

Week 3

Week 14 

 
The Eagles defense shut down the Oilers' run-and-shoot attack with four sacks, six forced fumbles (five lost) and 21 yards rushing on 11 attempts. Jerome Brown said after the game, "They brought the house, we brought the pain."

Standings

Awards and honors 
NFL Comeback Player of the Year – Jim McMahon QB

UPI NFC Defensive Player of the Year – Reggie White DE

References

External links 
 1991 Philadelphia Eagles at Pro-Football-Reference.com

Philadelphia Eagles seasons
Philadelphia Eagles
Philadelphia Eagles